Düsseldorf-Bilk station is a through station in the district of Bilk in the city of Düsseldorf in the German state of North Rhine-Westphalia. It has two platforms and it is classified by Deutsche Bahn as a category 4 station.

History
The station is on the new line opened by the Prussian state railways on 1 October 1891 between the Hamm Railway Bridge and Gerresheim as part of the construction of Düsseldorf Hauptbahnhof. The station building built in 1891 was demolished in 1986, as part of the rebuilding of the line for the establishment of Rhine-Ruhr S-Bahn lines S 8. On 18 March 2022, a new second platform for regional train services opened.

Services
The station is served by three S-Bahn lines:

 S 8 between Mönchengladbach and Wuppertal-Oberbarmen or Hagen, every 20 minutes
 S 11 between Bergisch Gladbach and Düsseldorf Airport, every 20 minutes
 S 28 between Mettmann Stadtwald or Wuppertal and Kaarster See, every 20 minutes

Since March 2022, the following five regional train services also serve the station:

 RE 4 between Aachen and Dortmund, every 60 minutes
 RE 6 between Cologne/Bonn Airport and Minden (Westf), every 60 minutes
 RE 10 between Kleve and Düsseldorf, every 30 minutes
 RE 13 between Venlo and Hamm (Westf), every 60 minutes
 RB 39 between Bedburg (Erft) and Düsseldorf, every 60 minutes on weekdays

It is served by two bus routes operated by Rheinbahn at 20-minute intervals: 835 and 836.

Stadtbahn
The Düsseldorf Stadtbahn has a tunnel from Düsseldorf-Bilk station to Düsseldorf-Wehrhahn station, known as the Wehrhahn line. This 3.5 km tunnel was completed in 2016. Just as every other underground line opened previously in Düsseldorf, the Wehrhahn line is a replacement for current surface tram lines. The trams on this line are entering the new tunnel over a ramp at Bilk station and run from there underneath the city centre towards the north-east, where they are emerging shortly before Wehrhahn railway station. Five new underground stations and the station Heinrich-Heine-Allee are part of the line, which serve an estimated daily passenger volume of approximately 53,000. These new stations are Pempelforter Straße, Schadowstraße, the existing station Heinrich-Heine-Allee, Benrather Straße, Graf-Adolf-Platz and Kirchplatz (Düsseldorf) in the direction from Wehrhahn station to Bilk station. The new lines are the U71, U72, U73 and U83.

References

Footnotes

Sources

Railway stations in Düsseldorf
S8 (Rhine-Ruhr S-Bahn)
S11 (Rhine-Ruhr S-Bahn)
S28 (Rhine-Ruhr S-Bahn)
Rhine-Ruhr S-Bahn stations
Düsseldorf VRR stations
Railway stations in Germany opened in 1891